The stimulus–response model is a characterization of a statistical unit (such as a neuron). The model allows the prediction of a quantitative response to a quantitative stimulus, for example one administered by a researcher. In psychology, stimulus response theory concerns forms of classical conditioning in which a stimulus becomes paired response in a subject's mind.

Fields of application

Stimulus–response models are applied in international relations, 
psychology, 
risk assessment, 
neuroscience,
neurally-inspired system design,
and many other fields.

Pharmacological dose response relationships are an application of stimulus-response models.

Mathematical formulation

The object of a stimulus–response model is to establish a mathematical function that describes the relation f between the stimulus x and the expected value (or other measure of location) of the response Y:

 

A common simplification assumed for such functions is linear, thus we expect to see a relationship like

 

Statistical theory for linear models has been well developed for more than fifty years, and a standard form of analysis called linear regression has been developed.

Bounded response functions

Since many types of response have inherent physical limitations (e.g. minimal maximal muscle contraction), it is often applicable to use a bounded function (such as the logistic function) to model the response. Similarly, a linear response function may be unrealistic as it would imply arbitrarily large responses. For binary dependent variables, statistical analysis with regression methods such as the probit model or logit model, or other methods such as the Spearman–Kärber method. Empirical models based on nonlinear regression are usually preferred over the use of some transformation of the data that linearizes the stimulus-response relationship.

One example of a logit model for the probability of a response to the real input (stimulus) , is

where  are the parameters of the function.

Conversely, a Probit model would be of the form 

where  is the cumulative distribution function of the normal distribution.

Hill equation 

In biochemistry and pharmacology, the Hill equation refers to two closely related equations, one of which describes the response (the physiological output of the system, such as muscle contraction) to Drug or Toxin, as a function of the drug's concentration. The Hill equation is important in the construction of dose-response curves.

Note that the Hill equation rearranges to a logistic function with respect to the logarithm of the dose (similar to a logit model).

References

Behavioral concepts
Psychological models

Further reading